The Welsh Rugby Union Division One North (also called the SWALEC Division One North for sponsorship reasons) is a rugby union league in Wales first implemented for the 1995/96 season. The league was known as Division Four North before the 2008-09 season. Division One North, Two North and Three North are self-contained leagues within the larger Swalec leagues, and clubs can not be promoted or demoted outside of the two leagues.

Competition format and sponsorship

Competition
There are 12 clubs in the WRU Division One North. During the course of a season (which lasts from September to April) each club plays the others twice, once at their home ground and once at that of their opponents for a total of 22 games for each club, with a total of 132 games in each season. Teams receive four points for a win and two point for a draw, an additional bonus point is awarded to either team if they score four tries or more in a single match. No points are awarded for a loss though the losing team can gain a bonus point for finishing the match within seven points of the winning team. Teams are ranked by total points, then the number of tries scored and then points difference. At the end of each season, the club with the most points is crowned as champion. If points are equal the tries scored then points difference determines the winner. The team who is declared champion at the end of the season but is not allowed promotion out of the Division One North league. The two lowest placed teams are relegated into the WRU Division Two North.

Sponsorship 

In 2008 the Welsh Rugby Union announced a new sponsorship deal for the club rugby leagues with SWALEC. The sponsorship is a three-year deal that will continue until the 2010/11 season at a cost of £1 million (GBP). The leagues sponsored are the WRU Divisions one through to six.

 (2002-2005) Lloyds TSB
 (2005-2008) Asda
 (2008-2011) SWALEC

2017/2018 season

League teams

 Bala RFC
 Bro Ffestiniog RFC
 Dolgellau RFC
 Colwyn Bay RFC
 Caernarfon RFC
 Bethesda RFC
 Llandudno RFC
 Llangefni RFC
 Mold RFC
 Nant Conwy RFC
 Pwllheli RFC
 Ruthin RFC

2017/2018 Table

2011/2012 season

League teams

 Bala RFC
 Bro Ffestiniog RFC
 Caernarfon RFC
 Bethesda RFC
 Llandudno RFC
 Llangefni RFC
 Mold RFC
 Nant Conwy RFC
 Pwllheli RFC
 Ruthin RFC

2011/2012 Table

2010/2011 season

League teams

 Bro Ffestiniog RFC
 Caernarfon RFC
 Colwyn Bay RFC
 Bethesda RFC
 Llandudno RFC
 Llangefni RFC
 Mold RFC
 Nant Conwy RFC
 Pwllheli RFC
 Ruthin RFC

2010/2011 Table

2009/2010 season

League teams
 Bro Ffestiniog RFC
 Caernarfon RFC
 Colwyn Bay RFC
 Denbigh RFC
 Llandudno RFC
 Llangefni RFC
 Mold RFC
 Nant Conwy RFC
 Pwllheli RFC
 Ruthin RFC

2009/2010 Table

2008/2009 season

League teams

 Bala RFC
 Caernarfon RFC
 Colwyn Bay RFC
 Denbigh RFC
 Dolgellau RFC
 Llandudno RFC
 Llangefni RFC
 Llanidloes RFC
 Mold RFC
 Nant Conwy RFC
 Pwllheli RFC
 Ruthin RFC

2008/2009 Table

2007/2008 season

League teams
 Bala RFC
 Caernarfon RFC
 Colwyn Bay RFC
 Denbigh RFC
 Dolgellau RFC
 Llandudno RFC
 Llangefni RFC
 Llanidloes RFC
 Mold RFC
 Nant Conwy RFC
 Newtown RFC
 Ruthin RFC

2007/2008 Table

Winners

References

3